Outright Games Ltd. is a British video game publisher focused on licensed games, mainly based on family-friendly properties similar to GameMill Entertainment. The company was co-founded in 2016 by Terry Malham as well as his children, Terry Malham-Wallis and Stephanie Malham. It operates offices in London, Los Angeles and Madrid.

In May 2021, the company launched a mobile gaming division.

Company philosophy 
In a 2019 gamesindustry.biz interview, Nick Button-Brown, chair of Outright's board of directors, admits that licensed games for children are "a really narrow focus, but the argument is that it's quite a good niche. If you deliver a licensed game for a kid, you know it's going to sell a certain amount, and that Walmart are going to stock it. It's a good, solid niche." Brown also claimed they were focused on developing games for traditional consoles as they are a "good, safe experience" compared to free-to-play mobile games whose business model has been controversial due to its pervasive use of microtransactions especially on titles marketed towards children, also tapping into the existing install base of consoles, whose previous owners hand down to their children or younger siblings to play on. "At the end of console cycles, licensed games tend to do particularly well."

Games published

References

External links 
 

Companies based in London
British companies established in 2016
Video game companies established in 2016
Video game publishers
Video game companies of the United Kingdom